Okperpiem is a suburb of Somanya in the Yilo Krobo municipality in the Eastern region of Ghana.

References 

Villages in Ghana